Kurt Ferdinand Roesch (1905–1984) was a German born American painter.

Biography
Roesch was born on December 12, 1905 in Berlin and studied painting with the expressionist Karl Hofer.  Roesch immigrated to the United States in 1933, living first in Katonah, New York, and then in New Canaan, Connecticut. He taught at Sarah Lawrence College from 1934 to 1972, and died October 8, 1984 at his home in New Canaan.

Man with Bird from 1977, in the collection of the Honolulu Museum of Art, demonstrates his semiabstract images that often reference animals or plants.  The Butler Institute of American Art (Youngstown, Ohio), the Columbus Museum of Art (Columbus, Ohio), the Frederick R Weisman Art Museum (Minneapolis, Minnesota), the Honolulu Museum of Art, the Metropolitan Museum of Art, the Museum of Modern Art (New York City), and the Sheldon Museum of Art (Lincoln, Nebraska) are among the public collections holding works by Roesch.

References

 Falk, Peter Hastings; Who Was Who in American Art; Artists Active 1898-1947, 1985
 Barr, Alfred; Painting and Sculpture in the Museum of Modern Art, 1977
 Jaques Cattell Press; Who's Who in American Art, 12th Edition, 1976
 Buffalo Fine Arts Academy; American Art in Upstate New York; Drawings, Watercolors and Small Sculptures, 1974
 Janis, Sidney; Abstract-Surrealist Art in America, 1969
 Pousette-Dart, Nathaniel; American Painting Today, 1956
 Mallett, Daniel Trowbridge; Index of Artists International Biographical (2 Vols), 1948

20th-century American painters
Modern painters
20th-century American photographers
People from the Province of Brandenburg
1905 births
1984 deaths
German emigrants to the United States